The London Intermediate Cup is the County Intermediate Cup of the London FA.  The London Intermediate Cup was first won by Barking in 1914–15.

Winners
Results of finals since 1914-15 are:

External links
 The Official Website of the London Football Association

County Cup competitions
Football competitions in London
Recurring sporting events established in 1914